Cleisocentron is a genus of flowering plants from the orchid family, Orchidaceae. It has a disjunct distribution, known from the Himalayas, Vietnam, China and Borneo.

Description
The species of this genus are tropical epiphytes with a pendent or erect habit. The leaves may be terete or broad. Both types of leaves may occur on the same specimen, as some species exhibit leaf polymorphy. Three species have blue flowers, but other colours, such as pink and white also occur.

Etymology
The generic name is derived from the Greek kleistos meaning closed, as well as kentron meaning spur. The name relates to the morphology of the spurred labellum.

Ecology

Pollination
There have been reports of pollination or visitation by ants, which was observed during field expeditions in Borneo. Alternatively, there have been speculations, that the nectariferous flowers are pollinated by butterflies.

Species 
Eight species are currently recognized:

Cleisocentron abasii Cavestro - Sabah
Cleisocentron gokusingii J.J.Wood & A.L.Lamb - Sabah
Cleisocentron kinabaluense Metusala & J.J.Wood - Sabah
Cleisocentron klossii (Ridl.) Garay - Vietnam
Cleisocentron malipoense  (Z.J.Liu & L.J.Chen) R.Rice - Malipo, Yunnan, China 
Cleisocentron merrillianum (Ames) Christenson - Sabah
Cleisocentron neglectum M.J.Mathew & J.Mathew - India (Karnataka) 
Cleisocentron pallens (Cathcart ex Lindl.) N.Pearce & P.J.Cribb - eastern Himalayas (Sikkim, Bhutan, Assam, India)

Formerly included species 
Cleisocentron collettianum (King & Pantl.) Garay is now considered a synonym of Robiquetia pachyphylla (Rchb.f.) Garay.

Horticulture
Cleisocentron is rarely found in cultivation. However, they are easy to cultivate.

See also 
 List of Orchidaceae genera

References

External links 

Aeridinae
Orchids of Asia
Vandeae genera
Orchids of India
Orchids of Borneo
Orchids of Vietnam
Flora of East Himalaya